Jose Elmer "OJ" Porteria (born May 9, 1994) is a Filipino professional footballer who plays as a winger or an attacking midfielder for Malaysia Super League club Kelantan United and the Philippines national team.

Born in the United States, he is a product of the D.C. United Academy. He moved to the Philippines in 2012 to play for Kaya and Ceres/United City, as well as the Philippines under-22 and under-23 teams.

Club career

Youth
Porteria started playing football at the age of four after his older brother had taught him and eventually joined his first ever club, The Fireballs. At the age of six, he joined a travel club called Team America where he would play until age 11 where he joined D.C. United's under-13 Super Y-League team and then eventually the D.C. United Academy. He was a member of the academy until 2012, where he moved to the Philippines and signed for local side Kaya.

Ceres-Negros
In July 2016, Porteria announced the end of his stint with Kaya. In January 2017, Ceres-Negros announced that they have signed in Porteria, along with few other players, to play for the club.

Ratchaburi Mitr Phol
Porteria left United City on November 16, 2020 and signed a three-year contract with Thai League 1 club Ratchaburi Mitr Phol on December 23.

Return to United City
In August 2021, United City announced Porteria's return to the club.

Kirivong Sok Sen Chey
In February 2022, it was announced that Porteria signed for Cambodian Premier League club Kirivong Sok Sen Chey.

International career

Philippines U23
Porteria first played for the Philippines at under-23 level when they competed in the 2011 Southeast Asian Games. He was a regular in the side and scored the Philippines' lone goal in the 2–1 defeat to Timor-Leste. In June the following year, he would be part of the Philippines under-22 team that competed in 2013 AFC U-23 Championship qualifiers.

Philippines
In April 2011, tryouts for the Philippines national football team were conducted in Daly City, California. One of the players who tried out was Porteria. He was successful and got invited to Manila the following month to train with the team ahead of the 2014 FIFA World Cup first round qualifiers. However, he wasn't selected in the final roster for the qualifiers.

In July 2011, Porteria was called up to the national team that traveled to Bahrain for a training camp which included a pair of friendly matches against Bahrain's national under-23 team. He made his unofficial debut in the first match which ended in a 2–1 loss. He wouldn't feature again for the Philippines until August 11, 2012 in a 3–1 defeat to USL Premier Development League team Chicago Inferno.

Porteria made his official international debut on September 5, 2012 against Cambodia, which ended in a scoreless draw. He replaced Paul Mulders inside the second half. However, it was not a FIFA full 'A' international friendly since the Cambodian side used seven substitutes instead of six.

International goals
Scores and results list the Philippines' goal tally first.

Personal life
Porteria attended Falls Church High School, where he graduated in 2012 and was part of the varsity soccer team and also a kicker for the varsity american football team.

Honors
Kaya
PFF National Men's Club Championship third place: 2013
United Football League Cup: 2015; third place: 2016
United Football League FA Cup runners-up: 2014

Ceres–Negros/United City
 Philippines Football League: 2017, 2018, 2019, 2020
Copa Paulino Alcantara: 2019

Philippines
Philippine Peace Cup: 2012, 2013

References

1994 births
Living people
Filipino footballers
Philippines international footballers
Association football wingers
Soccer players from Richmond, Virginia
Citizens of the Philippines through descent
Sportspeople from Richmond, Virginia
Ceres–Negros F.C. players
American sportspeople of Filipino descent
Kaya F.C. players
OJ Porteria
OJ Porteria
Expatriate footballers in Cambodia